The Casino du Lac-Leamy (formerly the Casino de Hull) is a government-run casino located in Gatineau, Quebec, Canada.

The casino was opened on March 24, 1996, in the former city of Hull, Quebec, the third of a group of casinos built by the provincial government to raise funds. Ottawa, the larger city across the Ottawa River, was also planning to build a casino in the early 1990s, but these plans were blocked by the Government of Ontario. The Gatineau casino thus also serves the nearby city of Ottawa and Eastern Ontario. It is operated by Société des casinos du Québec, a subsidiary of Loto-Québec.

The casino is built on a rocky precipice over what was once International Portland Cement Company quarry but is today Lac de la Carrière. This lake is home to a large fountain, whose jet is visible through much of the old Hull sector during the summer. To the east of the casino is Leamy Lake (in French: Lac Leamy), from which it gets its name. Attached to the casino is a 349-room Hilton hotel. The casino also has an 1,100-seat theatre that has become one of the main music venues in the Outaouais region. The casino is also home to several bars and restaurants. In the casino itself there are more than 1,800 slot machines and more than 65 tables including roulette, blackjack, baccarat, craps, and Texas hold 'em poker. It is open 24/7.

See also
 List of casinos in Canada

References

Notes

External links
 

Buildings and structures completed in 1996
Buildings and structures in Gatineau
Casinos in Quebec
Certified airports in Quebec
Heliports in Canada
Music venues in Quebec
Tourist attractions in Outaouais
1996 establishments in Quebec